George Daniels is an American former Negro league pitcher who played in the 1940s.

Daniels played for the Cincinnati Clowns in 1943. In four recorded games, he posted a 3.13 ERA over 23 innings.

References

External links
 and Seamheads

Year of birth missing
Place of birth missing
Cincinnati Clowns players
Baseball pitchers